Punica is a small genus of fruit-bearing deciduous shrubs or small trees  in the flowering plant family Lythraceae. The better known species is the pomegranate (Punica granatum). The other species, the Socotra pomegranate (Punica protopunica), is endemic to the island of Socotra. It differs in having pink (not red) flowers and smaller, less sweet fruit.

Although previously placed in its own family Punicaceae, recent phylogenetic studies have shown that Punica belongs in the family Lythraceae, and it is classified in that family by the Angiosperm Phylogeny Group.

The name is derived from the Latin word for the pomegranate, malum punicum, meaning "Carthaginian apple".

The oldest fossils of the genus are from the Eocene of Europe, with the genus being widespread in Europe during the Miocene epoch.

Extant Species

References

 

Lythraceae
Lythraceae genera
Fruit trees